"Do You Like This" is a song co-written and performed by American contemporary R&B singer Rome, issued as the second single from his eponymous debut album. It was his last song to chart on the Billboard Hot 100, peaking at #31 in 1997.

Music video

The official music video for the song was directed by Brian Luvar.

Charts

Weekly charts

Year-end charts

References

External links
 
 

1996 songs
1997 singles
Music videos directed by Brian Luvar
RCA Records singles
Rome (singer) songs
Songs written by Rome (singer)